Rättarboda is a locality situated in Upplands-Bro Municipality, Stockholm County, Sweden with 237 inhabitants in 2010.

References 

Populated places in Upplands-Bro Municipality